is a species of willow endemic to the Kantō and Tōhoku regions of Honshū, Japan.

Taxonomy
The species was first described by Japanese botanist Arika Kimura in 1973. The specific epithet honours Shigemitsu Fukao, who discovered the tree the previous year growing along the Yubiso River, a tributary of the upper Tone River, in Gunma Prefecture.

Description

Conservation status
Salix hukaoana is classed as Vulnerable on the Ministry of the Environment Red List.

References

hukaoana
Endemic flora of Japan
Species described in 1973